Malcolm Dingwall Mackay  (born 19 January 1942) is a Scottish former amateur footballer who made over 350 appearances in the Scottish League for Queen's Park. He later became president of the club and is a member of the club's committee. Mackay represented Scotland at amateur level and made one friendly appearance for Great Britain.

Personal life 
Mackay is married with two sons and a daughter. His oldest son, Malcolm Jr, also became a professional football player and manager. As of February 2012, aged 70, Mackay was semi-retired and working for an insurance company in Glasgow. He was appointed a Member of the Order of the British Empire (MBE) in the 2015 New Year Honours for services to football in Glasgow.

References

Scottish footballers
Scottish Football League players
Association football forwards
Queen's Park F.C. players
Living people
1942 births
People from Saltcoats
Queen's Park F.C. non-playing staff
Newmains United Community F.C. players
Scotland amateur international footballers
Members of the Order of the British Empire